Southam Rural District was a rural district in the county of Warwickshire, England. It was created in 1894 and consisted of 26 parishes, a further six parishes were added in 1932, when the Farnborough Rural District was disbanded. It was named after and administered from Southam.

Since 1 April 1974 it has formed part of the District of Stratford-on-Avon.

At the time of its dissolution it consisted of the following 32 civil parishes.

Avon Dassett
Bishops Itchington
Burton Dassett
Chadshunt
Chapel Ascote
Chesterton
Farnborough
Fenny Compton
Gaydon
Harbury
Hodnell
Ladbroke
Lighthorne
Long Itchington
Napton-on-the-Hill
Priors Hardwick
Priors Marston
Radway
Ratley and Upton
Shotteswell
Southam
Stockton
Stoneton
Ufton
Upper and Lower Radbourne
Upper and Lower Shuckburgh
Warmington
Watergall
Wills Pastures
Wormleighton

External links
Southam RD on visionofbritain.org.uk

History of Warwickshire
Local government in Warwickshire
Districts of England created by the Local Government Act 1894
Districts of England abolished by the Local Government Act 1972
Rural districts of England